James Bord (born 1981), is an entrepreneur and founder of shortcircuit.science, a company applying data science to medical prescription technology and climate adaption analysis. Originally from Stanmore, England, Bord now divides his time between London and the United States.

Poker career 

His biggest victory came in the 2010 World Series of Poker Europe Main Event, where he won $1,313,611 and became the first British champion of that event. He held pocket 10s against Fabrizio Baldassari's pocket 5s on the last hand to win the championship. A former banker for Citigroup, he left banking for poker in his mid-20s. Apart from that he has a lot cashes coming from the WSOP. Plus a second place in the Shootout - Invitational Aussie Millions Event, for more than $140,000.

Preferring high-stakes games to tournaments, Bord describes himself as a "mixed game cash player," usually playing high-low games.  When in Las Vegas he plays in $300–600 or $400–800 games at the major poker venues. He has cashed in eight other WSOP events, the best being sixth in the 2008 no limit 2-7 lowball.  As of April 2018, his lifetime live tournament winnings are $4,304,535.

References

1981 births
People from  Stanmore
Poker players from London
Living people
World Series of Poker bracelet winners
World Series of Poker Europe Main Event winners